Clytra rotundata is a species of leaf beetle in the subfamily Cryptocephalinae, that is native to Cyprus.

References

Beetles described in 1961
Clytrini